The 1994 French Figure Skating Championships took place in Rouen for singles and pairs and in Athis-Mons for ice dance. Skaters competed in the disciplines of men's singles, women's singles, pair skating, and ice dancing on the senior level. The event was used to help determine the French team to the 1994 World Championships and the 1994 European Championships.

Results

Men

Ladies

Pairs

Ice dance

External links
 French article

1993 in figure skating
French Figure Skating Championships, 1994
French Figure Skating Championships
1994 in French sport